Ukyō (右京, "the right side of the capital") refers to the area west of Suzaku Avenue, the central avenue in the ancient capitals of Japan, especially Kyoto.

It may also refer to:

Ukyo-ku, Kyoto
Ukyoshiki, the administrator of Ukyo. It was an old government post established by the Ritsuryo system.
Names derived from Ukyoshiki
 Ukyo Katayama, a Japanese racing driver
, Japanese writer
 Ukyo Kuonji, a Ranma ½ character
, Japanese professional baseball player
 Ukyo Tachibana, a Samurai Shodown character

See also 
Sakyo (disambiguation)